Nothing But the Truth is a 1929 American sound comedy film starring Richard Dix, loosely adapted from the play by James Montgomery and the 1914 novel of the same title by Frederic S. Isham.  The play was adapted again (more faithfully) as Nothing But the Truth (1941) starring Bob Hope and Paulette Goddard.

Separate French, German and Spanish versions were made at the Joinville Studios in Paris as part of Paramount's policy of multiple-language versions.

Plot
Robert Bennett (Richard Dix) is a stockbroker who is very carefree with other people's money. Encouraging clients to buy stocks in companies that are failing is all in a day's work to him. His fiancée Gwenn Burke (Dorothy Hall) has to raise $40,000 for a charity project, comes to him with $10,000 to invest from her charity group, and wants him to double it within five days.

Meanwhile, E. M. Burke (Berton Churchill), Frank Connelly (Louis John Bartels), and Clarence Van Dyke (Ned Sparks) bet Bennett they will pay him each $10,000 if he tells the truth for 24 hours. The men later go to a nightclub where they meet Sabel and Mabel Jackson (Wynne Gibson and Helen Kane), who are a gold-digging sister act.

Mabel Jackson sings Do Something. After the show, the sisters ask Mr. Burke to back their show for them. They are determined to hold Burke to his promise to finance their idea for a show and won't take no for an answer. They hold all the cards, as they have managed to enter Burke's home and refuse to leave without the cash. Mrs. Burke (Madeline Grey) learns from Robert that her husband had promised to back the sisters' show, which makes her furious. Robert continues to answer every question truthfully; his fiancée Dorothy asks him if he loves her and what he has done with all the money, he tells her the answer without telling a lie. By 4pm, Robert has won the $40,000 by telling the truth.

Cast
Richard Dix as Robert Bennett
Berton Churchill as E.M. Burke
Louis John Bartels as Frank Connelly
Ned Sparks as Clarence van Dyke
Wynne Gibson as Sabel Jackson
Helen Kane as Mabel Jackson
Dorothy Hall as Gwenn Burke
Madeline Grey as Mrs. E.M. Burke
Nancy Ryan as Ethel Clark
William Crane as Drunk
Preston Foster as Nightclub Patron

Production credits
The production credits on the film were as follows:
 Victor Schertzinger - director
 Monta Bell - producer
 James Montgomery - stage play
 John McGowan - adaptation
 Edward Cronjager - photography
 William Collier Sr.
 Ernst Fegté (uncredited)

See also
Do Something (1929 song)
Nothing But the Truth (1941 film)

References

External links
 
 
Nothing But the Truth (1929) at Richard Dix website
 Nothing But the Truth at Silent Era.com
Nothing But the Truth (1929) at the Internet Archive

1929 films
1929 comedy films
American comedy films
1920s English-language films
Paramount Pictures films
American black-and-white films
Films directed by Victor Schertzinger
1920s American films